Murder, Misery and Then Goodnight is Kristin Hersh's third solo album and quite a departure from her other solo recordings, in that it contains solely Appalachian folk songs about murder and death arranged by Kristin Hersh, rather than songs written by Hersh herself. Hersh's son, Ryder James O'Connell, plays piano and sings backing vocals.

The album was produced by Kristin Hersh, co-produced by Steve Rizzo and Billy O'Connell, and engineered by Steve Rizzo.

Track listing

References

External links
 Murder, Misery and Then Goodnight album page at 4AD

1998 albums
Kristin Hersh albums
4AD albums
Appalachian music